The Valencia–Sant Vicenç de Calders railway, also known as the Valencia–Tarragona railway is a railway line in Spain, beginning at Valencia Nord and ending at Sant Vicenç de Calders.

Route
The line links Valencia to Tarragona and onward to Barcelona, following the Mediterranean coast and serving major cities and towns along the coast including Sagunto, Castellón de la Plana, Tortosa and Tarragona. In January 2018, the Valencia–Castellón section was rebuilt with a third rail to dual gauge at a cost of €355 million, allowing standard gauge AVE high-speed rail services to run from Castellón to Madrid via Valencia. A new built 46·5 km cut-off section between Camp de Tarragona and Vandellòs bypassing the last remaining section of single track on the Mediterranean corridor west of Tarragona, started commercial services on January 13, 2020. The new section leads to a triangular junction with the Madrid–Barcelona high-speed rail line just west of Camp de Tarragona station.

Services
Along with aforementioned AVE services, Cercanías Valencia commuter rail services operate to Castellón, and regional Barcelona–Valencia–Alicante services and Rodalies de Catalunya regional services in Catalonia. A high speed Avant service from Tortosa to Barcelona-Sants, calling at L'Aldea, L'Hospitalet de l'Infant, Cambrils and Camp de Tarragona was introduced in February 2020. In addition the Euromed service connects the city of Barcelona to the city of Valencia in 2 hours and 35 minutes, running at speeds up to 220 km/h.

References

Railway lines in Catalonia
Railway lines in Spain
Iberian gauge railways
Railway lines opened in 1868